Dirk Louis Maria Van Mechelen (born 27 August 1957) was the Flemish minister of Finance and Budget and Town and Country Planning. He is a member of the Open Flemish Liberals and Democrats.

Education
He obtained a degree in history from the Katholieke Universiteit Leuven (Leuven, Belgium) in 1980.

Career
He started his professional career at Buchmann Optical Industries in Kapellen, the company of Jacky Buchmann. In 1982, he started his political career in the municipal council of Kapellen.

After the regional elections of 1999 he became Flemish minister of Town and Country Planning, Economy and Media. Since 2001 he is the mayor of Kapellen.

After the regional elections of 2004 he became Flemish minister of Finance and Budget and Town and Country Planning till 2009.

Honours 
2014: Grand officer in the Order of Leopold.

References

External links

1957 births
Living people
Government ministers of Belgium
KU Leuven alumni
Members of the Chamber of Representatives (Belgium)
Members of the Flemish Parliament
Open Vlaamse Liberalen en Democraten politicians
People from Kapellen, Belgium
21st-century Belgian politicians